Arkadiusz Bilski (born February 15, 1973) is a Polish football player. He has previously played in the Olympic Games. His previous teams include ZKS Granat Skarżysko, Stal Stalowa Wola, GKS Katowice, KSZO Ostrowiec and KS Ceramika Opoczno. His last team was Korona Kielce. He finished his career in the summer 2006.

References

1973 births
Polish footballers
Living people
Association football midfielders
GKS Katowice players
KSZO Ostrowiec Świętokrzyski players
Ceramika Opoczno players
Korona Kielce players
People from Skarżysko County
Sportspeople from Świętokrzyskie Voivodeship